Stephen Mark Darby (born 6 October 1988) is an English former professional footballer who played as a right-back. Darby represented England at under-19 level. He began his career playing on the winning team of the Liverpool FA Youth Cup in 2006 and played competitively for Liverpool from 2008 to 2012. Darby then joined the Bradford team that reached the 2013 Football League Cup Final, making over 200 appearances for the club and captaining the side for two seasons. Although he afterwards signed a 2-year contract with Bolton Wanderers in 2017, Darby retired from his career just over a year later at the age of 29 after being diagnosed with motor neurone disease.

Early life
Darby was brought up in Maghull, Merseyside, where he attended St. John Bosco's primary school and Maricourt Roman Catholic High School.

Club career

Liverpool

On 18 July 2006 Liverpool's official site announced that five academy players have been promoted to Melwood, Darby was one of them. Darby played in Liverpool's FA Youth Cup winning teams in 2006 and 2007 that defeated Manchester City and Manchester United's academies in the finals respectively, captaining the team in the 2006 final. He was first selected for the Liverpool squad which played Turkish side Galatasaray in the group stages of the UEFA Champions League in December 2006, but he was an unused substitute in that match. Despite being on the first team bench he didn't forget his roots and after a four-hour flight from Istanbul to Liverpool he went straight to The Hawthorns and played a full game including extra-time to help the youth team through to the fourth round.

During the 2007–08 season, Darby was the captain of Liverpool's reserves team that ended the campaign as northern and national champions. His performances earned him praises from manager Gary Ablett calling him 'Mr. Consistency'.

His first appearance in a competitive match was as a substitute in Liverpool's League Cup fourth round defeat against Tottenham Hotspur in November 2008.

He made his Champions League debut against PSV Eindhoven on 9 December 2008, coming on as a substitute alongside fellow homegrown players Jay Spearing and Martin Kelly. On 5 July 2009, Darby secured a three-year extension to his contract along with fellow Melwood graduate Jay Spearing.

He made his first competitive start for Liverpool against ACF Fiorentina in the UEFA Champions League on 9 December 2009 in a 2–1 defeat. His second competitive start came against Reading in the FA Cup. The game finished 1–1. Darby was praised by Liverpool centre-back Jamie Carragher for his performance in the game.

Darby made his Premier League debut against Tottenham Hotspur on 20 January 2010, coming on as a substitute in the 90th minute for Philipp Degen.

He was included in Liverpool's 21 man squad for the 2010–11 Premier League season.

He was released by the club at the end of the 2011–12 season.

Swindon

On 11 March 2010, Darby joined Swindon Town on loan for the remainder of the 2009–10 season. He started his first game on 13 March 2010 against Brighton & Hove Albion and played the full 90 minutes at right back. He then took part in the play-off semi final against Charlton Athletic, where he scored the decisive penalty in the shoot-out.

Notts County

On 1 November 2010, Notts County manager and ex-Liverpool player Paul Ince snapped up both Darby and Thomas Ince on a loan deal from Liverpool. He made his County debut on 6 November in an FA Cup 1st round match against Gateshead On 13 November, he started in County's 3–1 league defeat to Exeter City. A week later, he started again in the 1–0 home defeat to Tranmere Rovers. On 23 November, he started and was named Man of the Match in the 1–0 win against one of his former clubs, Swindon. Again he started on 11 December, this time in a win as County defeated the Milton Keynes Dons at home, 2–0. After his loan spell completed on 3 January 2011 he returned to Liverpool. He rejoined County later in January for the remainder of the season, before returning to Liverpool in early May.

Rochdale

On 7 July 2011, Rochdale confirmed the signing of Darby on loan for the 2011–12 campaign. He made his debut on 6 August 2011, against Sheffield Wednesday, playing the full 90 minutes in a 2–0 defeat. He was the fans' man of the match in the 0–0 home draw against Carlisle United on 16 August 2011. He made 40 appearances for the club during his season-long loan.

Bradford City

On 4 July 2012, Darby signed for Bradford City on a two-year contract. He made his debut on 11 August 2012 in a 1–0 League Cup win against Notts County. He made his league debut a week later against Gillingham. He made his home debut on 21 August, coming on as a substitute for Nahki Wells in a 1–0 win against Fleetwood Town. On 25 September, he scored the only goal of his career in the 115th minute of a 3–2 win against Burton Albion in the League Cup third round. Bradford went on to reach the final, beating Premier League sides Wigan Athletic, Arsenal and Aston Villa in subsequent rounds.

Darby won 7 awards at the Bradford City end-of-season dinner in May 2014. Darby was made club captain after Gary Jones joined Notts County, and signed a new three-year contract in June 2014. For the 2016–17 season, Darby was replaced by new signing Romain Vincelot as captain, under new manager Stuart McCall. In May 2017 it was announced that he would be released at the end of the season, when his contract expired.

Bolton Wanderers

On 7 July 2017, Darby signed a two-year contract at Bolton Wanderers, reuniting with former manager Phil Parkinson.

Retirement

On 18 September 2018, Darby announced his retirement from professional football at the age of 29 after being diagnosed with motor neurone disease.

Personal life
Darby is married to Steph Houghton, captain of Manchester City Women and former captain of England women's national team. They married on 21 June 2018.

Darby set up the Darby Rimmer MND Foundation to fund support for families affected by motor neurone disease, and research a cure. In July 2019 two of his former clubs (Liverpool and Bradford City) held a fundraising match. His final club, Bolton Wanderers, played a fund-raising match against a team consisting of legendary Bolton players on 12 November 2021 to help raise money for the recovery of the mother of Gethin Jones, a Bolton player, as she had been diagnosed with motor neurone disease; a quarter of the proceeds went to Darby's charity.

Career statistics

International career
Darby was part of England's squad for UEFA European U19 Championship qualifications in May 2007 and made two appearances alongside Liverpool teammates Jack Hobbs, Craig Lindfield and Adam Hammill.

Honours
Liverpool Youth
 FA Youth Cup: 2005–06, 2006-07

Bradford City
Football League Two play-offs: 2013
Football League Cup runner-up: 2012–13

Individual
Bradford City Player of the Year: 2013–14

References

External links

 LFChistory.net profile
 
 

1988 births
Living people
People from Maghull
Sportspeople from the Metropolitan Borough of Sefton
Footballers from Liverpool
English footballers
Association football fullbacks
Liverpool F.C. players
Swindon Town F.C. players
Notts County F.C. players
Rochdale A.F.C. players
Bradford City A.F.C. players
Bolton Wanderers F.C. players
Premier League players
English Football League players
England youth international footballers
People with motor neuron disease